KGTW is a commercial country music radio station in Ketchikan, Alaska, broadcasting on 106.7 FM.

It is owned and operated by Alaska Broadcast Communications. The studios are at 526 Stedman Street in Ketchikan, with sister station KTKN.

External links
 
 

Buildings and structures in Ketchikan Gateway Borough, Alaska
Country radio stations in the United States
Ketchikan, Alaska
GTW